The Prime Minister's Youth Council is an advisory board created by the Prime Minister of Canada Justin Trudeau in 2016. Currently, 10 Canadian youth aged 16 to 24 comprise the non-partisan board. Members advise the prime minister on education, economy, climate change and other issues affecting youth.

Trudeau announced the formation of the council on Twitter on 19 June 2016, after which he fielded questions online. It was the first time he used social media to make a major announcement as Prime Minister.

Members of the council meet in-person or online via video or audio conference on a regular basis. Meetings may take place anywhere in Canada and the council held exceptional virtual meetings during the COVID-19 pandemic in 2020.

Some have felt that online meetings may be a hindrance to any Inuit youth on the council, as Internet access is not widespread in Nunavut, Nunatsiavut, Nunavik and other Arctic areas of Canada. Trudeau stated that he will work with organisations to ensure all youth are connected during the initiative.

Members
The first 15 members of the Council were announced in September 2016, 11 members from the second cohort were announced in January 2017, 10 members from the third cohort in June 2018, and 8 members from the fourth cohort in August 2019.

Current members

Cohort 5  — July 2021 to July 2023 

 Haleema Ahmed - Markham, Ontario
 Marianne Arseneau - Fredericton, New Brunswick
 Abhinav Dhillon - Edmonton, Alberta
 David He - Burnaby, British Columbia
 Maël Houck - Montreal, Quebec
 Ira Mamis - Whitehorse, Yukon
 Sarah Mazhero - Montreal, Quebec
Jenna Robar - Bedford, Nova Scotia
Nalyn Tindall - Camrose, Alberta
Topaza Yu - Saskatoon, Saskatchewan

Past members

Cohort 1 — September 2016 to March 2018 
Sara Abdessamie – Fredericton, New Brunswick
Mustafa Ahmed –  Toronto, Ontario
Hani Al Moulia –  Regina, Saskatchewan (originally a refugee from Syria)
Alex Bouchard –  Haines Junction, Yukon
Joseph Darcel  –  Winnipeg, Manitoba
Gregory Francis  –  Kingsclear First Nation,  New Brunswick
Sylvia Pascua Matte –  Fort Simpson, Northwest Territories
Rachel Smale –  Pond Inlet, Nunavut
Donovan Taplin –  Wabana, Bell Island, Newfoundland and Labrador
Aaron Taylor –  Debert, Nova Scotia
Macgregor 'Mac' Tebbutt  – Penticton, British Columbia
Élyse Tremblay-Longchamps  – Montreal, Quebec
Nmesomachukwu Umenwofor-Nweze  –  Iqaluit, Nunavut (originally from Nigeria)
Ashley Whiteman  –  Edmonton, Alberta
Chris Zhou –  Charlottetown, Prince Edward Island

Cohort 2 — January 2017 to January 2019 
Rayene Bouzitoun – Montreal, Quebec
Simone Cavanaugh – Montreal, Quebec
Molly French – Sherwood Park, Alberta
Lauren Kennedy – Ancaster, Ontario
Dana Kenny – Charlottetown, Prince Edward Island
Francois-Olivier Picard – Québec, Quebec
Neha Rahman – Toronto, Ontario
Gabe Senecal – Melfort, Saskatchewan
Sara Wheale – Breton, Alberta
Justin Charles Wong – West Vancouver, British Columbia
Riley Yesno –  Thunder Bay and Eabametoong First Nation, Ontario

Cohort 3 — June 2018 to September 2020 

 Zander Affleck - Yellowknife, Northwest Territories
 Habon Ali - Toronto, Ontario
 Jack Campbell - Vancouver, British Columbia
 Ashley Cummings - Yukon; Nunavut
 Elijah Dietrich - Winnipeg, Manitoba
 Tagalik Eccles - Rankin Inlet, Nunavut
 Sagar Grewal - Calgary, Alberta
Pier-Maude Lanteigne - New Brunswick
François Lépine-Cossette - Montreal, Quebec
Kathryn McIntosh - Halifax, Nova Scotia

Cohort 4 — June 2019 to December 2021 

Jamuna Bothé - Moncton, New Brunswick
Alfred Burgesson - Halifax, Nova Scotia
Sarah Fancy - Nova Scotia
Erin Knight - Manitoba
Conor McIsaac - St. John's, Newfoundland and Labrador
Nancy Mitchell - Toronto, Ontario
Brooks Roche - Montague, Prince Edward Island
Sila Rogan - Winnipeg, Manitoba

References

External links

2016 establishments in Canada
Justin Trudeau
Government agencies established in 2016
Government of Canada
Youth in Canada